Gumla district is one of the twenty-four districts of Jharkhand state, India, and Gumla town is the administrative headquarters of this district.

Etymology
For centuries, the place was a meeting center for people from the hinterland who flocked here to exchange goods using the barter system, and the place was called Gaw-Mela.  Gumla is believed to derive its name from Gaw-Mela, which consists of two words of Hindi (also used in several local dialects),  namely, Gaw (cows and the cattle) and Mela, that is, a fair. The place became known as Gaw-mela, and then the word transformed itself into Gumla.

Politics 

 |}

Administration 
District Commissioner: Sushant Gaurav (IAS)

Administrative Units

Sub Divisions 
There are 3 subdivisions in gumla district:
Gumla
Basia
Chainpur

Blocks/Anchals 

Gumla district consists of 12 Blocks. The following are the list of the Blocks in Gumla district:

Panchayats 
There are 159 Panchayats in the district.

Villages 
 

There are 952 Villages in the District.

History
During regin of the Nagvanshi dynasty Navratangarh was one of the capital of Nagvanshi.

During British rule Gumla was under Lohardaga district. In 1843 it was brought under Bishunpur province that was further named Ranchi. In fact Ranchi district came into existence in 1899. In 1902 Gumla became Sub-division under Ranchi district. On 18 May 1983 Gumla District came into existence. Sri Jagannath Mishra then ruling Chief Minister of Bihar inaugurated it and Sri Dwarika Nath Sinha acquired the post of first deputy commissioner of the newly created district.

Gumla is considered to be the birthplace of the Hindu God Hanuman. A temple a few kilometers away from the city off the Gumla-Ghaghra road is dedicated to him and his mother. The district contains mountains named Risyamook, which are mentioned in the Ramayana.

The district is currently a part of the Red Corridor.

Geography
Geographically, Gumla is located on southern part of the Chota Nagpur plateau which forms the eastern edge of the Deccan plateau system.

There are three major rivers, which flow through the Gumla district viz. the South Koel, the North Koel and the Sankh. There are various streams/ tributaries to the main rivers on which there are some picturesque waterfalls, as for example Sadni Falls.

The terrain is highly undulating and there are existence of many rivers and streams. The forest cover of the district is 1.35 lakh hectares out of the total 5.21 lakh hectares of land i.e. round 27% of the total area of the district.

Climate
Gumla district enjoys a good climate characterized by a pleasant cold and temperate weather conditions. Gumla has a sub-tropical climate. Temperature ranges from maximum 40 to 20 °C during summer, and minimum 21 to 3 °C during winter. The annual rainfall is about 1450 mm. From June to September the rainfall level is about 1,150 mm.

Economy
Gumla district has rich natural and mineral resources. There are 23 bauxite mines and 68 stone mines in Gumla district. Besides these there is good number of brick makers.  In Gumla District the important minerals like bauxite and laterite (aluminium ore) are found in villages of Amkipani, Langdatanr, Chirodih, Jalim, Narma, Bahagara and Gurdari of Bishunpur block, Langatanr, Lupungpat and Chota-Agiatu in Chainpur block and Harup, Serengdag and Jalim in Ghaghra block.  Beside these china clay is also found in some part of the district. Other mining activities like stone crusher, Brick kiln and stone chip mining lease are also available in different part of the district.

In 2006 the Indian government named Gumla one of the country's 250 most backward districts (out of a total of 640). It is one of the 21 districts in Jharkhand currently receiving funds from the Backward Regions Grant Fund Programme (BRGF).

Demographics

According to the 2011 census Gumla district has a population of 1,025,213, roughly equal to the nation of Cyprus or the US state of Montana. This gives it a ranking of 439rd in India (out of a total of 640). Its population growth rate over the decade 2001-2011 was 23.21%.	Gumla	has a sex ratio of 	993	females for every 1000 males, and a literacy rate of 66.92%.

As of the 2011 Census of India, Gumla had a population of 1,025,213 which is 3.11% of total Jharkhand population. Out of total 1,025,656: 514,730 are males and 510,926 are female; this makes the sex ratio of Gumla 993, which better than India's sex ratio. Gumla has an average literacy rate of 66.92%. In Gumla, 15% of the population is under 6 years of age. 3.2% of the population are from Scheduled Castes, 68.9% are from Scheduled Tribes. 44.62% were followers of Sarna, 30.19% were Hindus, 19.75% Christians and 5.02% Muslims.

Languages

At the time of the 2011 Census of India, 50.75% of the population in the district spoke Sadri, 29.61% Kurukh, 7% Hindi, 4.69% Mundari, 3.73% Kharia and 2.31% Urdu as their first language.

Education 
In 1986, Rakesh Popli and his wife, Rama (an expert in childhood education), founded the first Ekal Vidyalaya (one-teacher) schools to bring education to the tribes of the region. 
From 2018, Deptt. of Higher and Technical Education, Govt. of Jharkhand is going to start Polytechnic College "Gumla Polytechnic".The Polytechnic college will be run and manage under "PPP" Mode by Gumla Educational Foundation.

Three colleges under Ranchi University:
 Kartik Oraon College
 Karunavati Devi Memorial College
 Women's College

Technical Institute 
 Gumla Polytechnic
 IIST Computer Institute
 Media INFOTECH
 Wings IT

Schools in Gumla:
 Adarsh Vidya Mandir School, Pugu
 Chanchal Cygnus School, Dumerdih 
 D.A.V. Public School, Neemtoli
 Don Bosco School, Bhamni
 Kendriya Vidyalaya Gumla
 Notre Dame School
 Oxford Public School
 S.S. High School
 Saraswati Shishu-Vidya Mandir
 Solitaire Educational Academy 
 St. Ignatius School
 St. Patrick School
 St. Stephen's School
 Ursuline Convent School
 Wescott Public School
 Jawahar Navodaya Vidyalaya, Masaria Dam

St. Ignatius School, founded in 1935 and administered by the Jesuits, has produced international-level hockey players.

Culture
Gumla has a rich culture.  The majority of people speak Nagpuri and Hindi.
Karma - A holy festival celebrated by the people in almost all places of this district.
Sarhul - A festival celebrated by the people and Jhankis and Rallies were organised around the main town Gumla. Ladies put flowers (Gulaichi Flower) on their hair and gents put it on their ears.
Ramnavami - A holy festival celebrated with huge sound, and Jhankies and Rallies.

Tourist attractions
Palkot Fort- Palkot Fort is a historic place which was one of the capital of the Nagvanshi dynasty. It is located in Palkot block of the district. 
Palkot Wildlife Sanctuary
The name of the village has been derived from the name of goddess Anjani, mother of Hanuman. Many objects of archeological importance obtained from this place has been placed at Patna Museum. It is believed to be the birthplace of Lord Hanuman.
Hapamuni - The ancient village Mahamaya temple that is the identity of this village. Hapamuni Mahamaya temple traces its origin to 11th century. It also has some ancient rock sculpture in front of temple dating to that period. Moreover, with the arrival of Hapamuni agro tech, the village economy has reached new dimensions.
Nagfeni - It is known for the Jagannath temple and there is a big rock in the shape of snake 'Nag'.
Navratangarh- It was the seat of old Nagvanshi kings located in Sisai block of the district. 
Tanginath - Tanginath Dham is located in Gumla's Dumri block. Several devotees during the month of Shravan come to shrine which goes back to seventh or ninth Century AD.

References

External links

 Official district government website

 
Districts of Jharkhand
Minority Concentrated Districts in India
1983 establishments in Bihar